{{DISPLAYTITLE:C11H13NO6}}
The molecular formula C11H13NO6 (molar mass: 255.23 g/mol, exact mass: 255.0743 u) may refer to:

 Caramboxin
 Diroximel fumarate

Molecular formulas